Tom Ramsey (born July 9, 1961) is a former professional American football quarterback, who played five seasons in the National Football League (NFL) for the New England Patriots and one season for the Indianapolis Colts. Earlier he played for the Los Angeles Express and the Oakland Invaders of the United States Football League (USFL).

Ramsey graduated from Kennedy High School in Granada Hills, California, in 1979. When Ramsey was quarterback for Kennedy, the quarterback at rival high school Granada Hills was John Elway.

At UCLA, he played an outstanding Rose Bowl game in 1983 and was awarded the game MVP along with Don Rogers. In 1998, Ramsey was inducted into the UCLA Hall of Fame, and in 2007, Ramsey was inducted into the Rose Bowl Hall of Fame.
He is also an analyst for college football on ESPN and for college and NFL football on ESPN Radio.

Ramsey was the last quarterback of the New England Patriots to wear jersey #12 prior to the legendary Tom Brady.

See also
 List of NCAA major college football yearly passing leaders

References 

1961 births
Living people
People from Encino, Los Angeles
American football quarterbacks
UCLA Bruins football players
New England Patriots players
Indianapolis Colts players
Los Angeles Express players
College football announcers
National Football League announcers
Players of American football from Los Angeles